Amazing Detective Di Renjie 2, also known as Shen Tan Di Renjie 2, is the second installment in a four-season Chinese television series based on gong'an detective stories related to Di Renjie, a Tang dynasty magistrate and statesman. Written and directed by Qian Yanqiu, the series starred Liang Guanhua as the titular protagonist, and was first broadcast on CCTV-8 on 20 November 2006, two years after the first season. It was followed by Amazing Detective Di Renjie 3 in 2008, and Mad Detective Di Renjie in 2010. The series was released in the United States on March 21, 2018 on Toku.

Plot
The plot is divided into three parts as follows:
 Bian Guan Yi Ying (边关疑影), covering episodes 1 to 13.
 She Ling (蛇灵), covering episodes 14 to 29.
 Xue Se Jiang Zhou (血色江州), covering episodes 30 to 40.

Cast
 Liang Guanhua as Di Renjie
 Zhang Zijian as Li Yuanfang
 Lü Zhong as Wu Zetian
 Jiang Xinyan as Di Ruyan (Su Xian'er)
 Xu Qian as Zeng Tai
 Xu Xiaobei as Ilterish Qaghan
 Qiao Hong as Xiao Qingfang
 Zhao Zhigang as Di Chun
 Yan Yansheng as Wang Xiaojie
 Jiang Changyi as Li Kaigu
 Song Chuyan as Zhao Wenhui
 Zhang Chengxiang as Qiu Jing
 Huo Ercha as Quan Shancai
 Liang Kai as Zhang Huan
 Jia Yanfeng as Li Lang
 Deng Wei as Mochuo
 Cong Shan as Huang Zhen
 Zhao Zhongwei as Li Changhe
 Zhou Ying as Su Honghui
 Li Xijing as Harile
 Du Gang as Song Wuji
 Yuan Peng as General Sun
 Meng Lingfei as Yang Fang
 Liu Jihe as Renkuo
 An Qi'er as Wu Qishi
 Shao Yongcheng as Zhang Jianzhi
 Fu Hongjun as Wu Sansi
 Gao Peng as Zhu Feng
 Yang Zengyuan as Daleha
 Chen Lei as Wang Tiehan
 Shao Wanlin as Yuan Tiangang
 Shi Liming as Huang Shengyan
 Zhang Ping as Jingkong
 Ji Jun as Wu Xiang
 Qu Wenting as Su Xian'er's decoy
 Chunyu Shanshan as Hui Wenzhong
 Shu Yan as Xiaomei / Xiaofeng
 Li Shilong as Lu Cheng
 Su Gang as Huan Bin
 Yu Lianwei as Tujueying
 Xu Shengxia as Abbot
 Zhao Junkai as Xue Qinglin
 Xie Zibin as Jinniang
 Wang Xinsheng as Li Xian
 Long Muxue as Lin Yongzhong
 Bao Yucheng as Wen Kai
 Yang Si as Xiaoyun
 Chen Jidong as Zhang Xiangong
 Fu Xuebin as Ge Bin
 Pan Yaochu as Wu Si
 Wang Peng as Zhang Yi
 Xing Ying as Lanxiang
 Qi Jingbin as Feng Wanchun
 Wu Mo'ai as Wu Shun
 Lu Tao as Huang Wenyue
 Wu Xiangqi as Xiaohui
 Yang Ming as Du Er

External links
  Amazing Detective Di Renjie (Season 2) on Sina.com
 http://www.youku.com/show_page/id_zcbffd032962411de83b1.html

2006 Chinese television series debuts
Television series set in the Zhou dynasty (690–705)
Gong'an television series
Judge Dee
Mandarin-language television shows
China Central Television original programming
Television series set in the 7th century
Cultural depictions of Wu Zetian
Cultural depictions of Di Renjie